Genisis Lagumbay Libranza (born 27 September 1993) is a Filipino professional boxer.

Professional boxing career
Libranza made his professional debut against Jhonny Belo on 8 February 2014. He won the fight by unanimous decision. Libranza amassed an 11–0 record during the next three years, with eight of those victories coming by way of stoppage. This undefeated streak earned Libranza the right to challenge the reigning IBO flyweight champion Moruti Mthalane on 28 April 2017. He suffered both his first professional loss, as well as his first stoppage loss, as Mthalane won the fight by a fourth-round knockout.

Libranza faced Romulo Ramayan Jr. for the MiniProBA title on 24 July 2017. He won the fight by a first-round technical knockout. Referee Ramuel Ovalo waved the fight off at the 2:35 minute mark, after Ramayan Jr. turned his back to his opponent, following a flurry of punches from Libranza.

Libranza faced Yujie Zeng on 29 September 2017. He won the fight by unanimous decision, with scores of 79–73, 78–74 and 80–72. Libranza faced Michael Enriquez on 17 December 2017. He won the fight by majority decision, with judges scoring the fight 98–92 for him, while the third judge scored it as an even 95–95 draw.

Libranza challenged Ryan Rey Ponteras for the PGA flyweight title on 14 April 2018. He won the fight by split decision, with two judges scoring the fight 115–113 and 117–112 for Libranza, while the third judge scored it 116–112 for Ponteras. Libranza made his first title defense against Renz Rosia on 14 October 2018. He won the fight by unanimous decision, with scores of 116–111, 115–112 and 114–113. Rosia was deducted a point in the fifth round for repeated low blows.

Libranza made his United States debut against Gilberto Mendoza on 9 February 2019, as the fight took place at the Dignity Health Sports Park in Carson, California. He won the fight by unanimous decision, with all three judges awarding Libranza a 78–74 scorecard. Libranza had his second consecutive United States fight on 20 July 2019, when he was scheduled to face Carlos Maldonado. He won the fight by a fourth-round technical knockout.

Libranza was expected to challenge the reigning WBO Oriental Bantamweight champion Vincent Astrolabio on 27 February 2021, following a 15-month absence from the sport. Astrolabio later withdrew from the bout for undisclosed reasons, and was replaced by John Mark Apolinario. He won the fight by a first-round knockout.

Professional boxing record

References

1993 births
Living people
Boxers from Agusan del Sur
Filipino male boxers
Flyweight boxers